The Silurians are a race of reptilian humanoids in the long-running British science fiction television series Doctor Who. The species first appeared in Doctor Who in the 1970 serial Doctor Who and the Silurians, and were created by Malcolm Hulke. The first Silurians introduced are depicted as prehistoric and scientifically advanced sentient humanoids who predate the dawn of man; in their backstory, the Silurians went into self-induced hibernation to survive what they predicted to be a large atmospheric upheaval caused by the Earth capturing the Moon.

The Silurians introduced in the 1970 story are broad, three-eyed land-dwellers. The 1972 serial The Sea Devils, also by Hulke, introduced their eponymous amphibious cousins. Both Silurians and Sea Devils made an appearance in 1984's Warriors of the Deep, and did not appear in the show again before its cancellation in 1989. Following the show's revival in 2005, heavily redesigned Silurans were reintroduced to the series in 2010, and have recurred frequently since then, while the Sea Devils first reappeared in 2022, with their designs mostly unchanged. In 2018 the real-life scientists Adam Frank and Gavin Schmidt named their Silurian hypothesis for the fictional species.
 
Commonly called Silurians, after their supposed origins in the Silurian period, the creatures have also been referred to by other names. In The Sea Devils, the Third Doctor (Jon Pertwee) claims that "properly speaking", the Silurians should have been called "Eocenes". The name Homo reptilia is first used to describe the creatures in the novelisation Doctor Who and the Cave-Monsters (1974), and is first used in the series proper in the episode "The Hungry Earth" (2010). In The Sea Devils, an amphibious Silurian is dubbed a "Sea Devil" by the human workman Clark (Declan Mulholland), while in Warriors of the Deep, the land-dwelling Silurians use the term "Sea Devil" to refer to their aquatic counterparts.

Creation

Drawing on the ideas of the Quatermass serials, producer Peter Bryant and producer and script editor Derrick Sherwin decided that for the series' seventh season, the show's protagonist the Doctor should be restricted to contemporary Earth and work alongside the UNIT organisation, featured prominently in the sixth season's serial The Invasion. Producer Barry Letts and script editor Terrance Dicks, inheriting this new vision for the series, also wanted their stories for the seventh season to have a serious, deeper subtext. They approached Malcolm Hulke, co-writer of the Patrick Troughton serials The Faceless Ones (1967) and The War Games (1969), to write a serial for this new season.

Hulke saw limitations with this earthbound format – he believed there would be two types of stories, one featuring mad scientists and the other alien invasions. Terrance Dicks claims credit for thinking of the idea of creatures that had been there all along; however, other sources give Hulke credit for deliberately thinking his way outside his earlier preconceptions.

While planning stories for Doctor Who'''s ninth season, Dicks and Letts decided to revive the Silurian concept, this time with the twist of these new Silurians originating in the sea. Originally dubbed "Sea Silurians", they were rechristened "Sea Devils" for dramatic effect as Hulke's storyline was edited.

Johnny Byrne, writer of the Peter Davison serial Warriors of the Deep (1984), notes that the Myrka creature was created to absolve the Silurians from the guilt of genocide, using the creature as a weapon of last resort.

Appearances

Television
In their first appearance in "Doctor Who and the Silurians" (1970), a group of Silurians are awakened from hibernation by the energy from a nearby nuclear power research center in Derbyshire. The Third Doctor (Jon Pertwee) initially manages to negotiate an honourable compromise with the colony's leader. Unfortunately, the colony's leader is murdered by a younger Silurian who becomes the new leader, intent on a far more aggressive policy. To that end, the Silurians then attempt to reclaim the planet from humanity by releasing a deadly virus and attempting to disperse the Van Allen radiation belt. Both plans were thwarted by the Doctor. Despite the Doctor's best efforts to broker a peaceful solution, the Silurians are still determined to exterminate humanity, only to have their base destroyed by UNIT on the orders of Brigadier Lethbridge-Stewart (Nicholas Courtney) to preempt this open threat.

In "The Sea Devils" (1972), an amphibious variety of Silurians are awakened from their hibernation by a renegade Time Lord known as the Master (Roger Delgado), who persuades them to reclaim the planet from the human race. Despite the Third Doctor's efforts to convince them otherwise, the Sea Devils eventually decide to go to war, forcing the Doctor to destroy their base. It is revealed, however, that there were many colonies still in hibernation around the world. The land-based Silurians and the "Sea Devils" next appeared, together, in "Warriors of the Deep" (1984), where they attempt again to reclaim Earth from the humans. Set in the year 2084 during a prolonged "cold war" between factions of humanity, the serial describes the Sea Devils as being elite warriors; they sport bulletproof samurai-style armour. The Fifth Doctor (Peter Davison) tries in vain to prevent any bloodshed against either species; he tells companions Tegan Jovanka (Janet Fielding) and Vislor Turlough (Mark Strickson) to give the Silurians oxygen to keep them safe from the hexachromite gas he released into the base's atmosphere. The last surviving Silurian in the episode, however, is killed by Turlough, leaving the Doctor despondent.

Silurians are reintroduced to the series, following its cancellation and revival, in the 2010 two part story, "The Hungry Earth" and "Cold Blood", in which Silurians are awoken in 2020 by an underground drilling operation. These Silurians lack the third eye of their 1970–1984 counterparts, and wear masks. Having misinterpreted the drilling as a deliberate attack, the Silurians take hostages. After a protracted conflict, the Eleventh Doctor (Matt Smith) leaves behind Tony Mack (Robert Pugh) and Nasreen Chaudhry (Meera Syal) in the Silurian city to act as ambassadors to the human race when they re-awaken in a thousand years, despite the race being active again 64 years later in "Warriors of the Deep".

In "The Pandorica Opens" (2010), some Silurians appear in A.D. 102 alongside various alien enemies of the Doctor (including alien Daleks, Cybermen, Sontarans, Judoon and other species) to imprison the Doctor in the mythical "Pandorica" in order, as they see it, to save the universe from him.

Recurring character Madame Vastra (Neve McIntosh) is then introduced in "A Good Man Goes to War" (2011) as a Silurian detective in the Victorian era, who befriended the Doctor after a brief rampage on the London Underground. She lives with her human wife Jenny Flint (Catrin Stewart), and after "A Good Man", also employs the Sontaran Strax (Dan Starkey) as her butler. The "Paternoster Gang", as the three are known, sometimes including the Doctor, appear again in "The Snowmen" (2012) and its three short prequels in 2012–2013, "The Crimson Horror", "The Name of the Doctor" (both 2013), and "Deep Breath" (2014). In "The Crimson Horror", Vastra claims to be from 65 million years ago.

Silurians are mentioned in the 2011 Torchwood: Miracle Day episode "The Blood Line" (2011); Captain Jack Harkness (John Barrowman) briefly muses that the Blessing (an ancient phenomenon beneath the Earth's surface) could be out of "Silurian mythology".

A Silurian doctor named Malohkeh (Richard Hope) is seen attending to Winston Churchill (Ian McNeice) in "The Wedding of River Song" (2011) in an aborted timeline. Hope plays another Silurian in "Dinosaurs on a Spaceship" (2012), seen briefly on a computer screen. The titular spaceship is a Silurian Ark searching for a new planet with a cargo of dinosaurs, the Silurian colony on board having been ejected from the ship by Solomon (David Bradley) prior to the episode. The ship is shown to have reached a planet named Siluria with its dinosaurs at the episode's conclusion.

In "The Time of the Doctor" (2013), many Silurian Arks are seen among the ships gathered round Trenzalore.

Sea Devils made their first modern appearance in the 2022 special "Legend of the Sea Devils" (2022), a Thirteenth Doctor (Jodie Whittaker) story. Unlike the Silurians, their appearance and design are mostly unchanged from the original series.

Literature
All of the Silurian stories on television prior to 2010 were novelised. The novelisation of Doctor Who and the Silurians, Doctor Who and the Cave-Monsters (1974) adds a prologue which features the beginning of the Silurians' hibernation; the novelisation avoids referring to the reptiles as Silurians. Terrance Dicks' novelisation of Warriors of the Deep (1984) describes Icthar, the sole survivor of the Silurian Triad, as a survivor of the Silurian colony in the caves near the nuclear research facility from Doctor Who and the Silurians; according to this book, the Silurians were only sealed away, not destroyed. In Seventh Doctor Virgin New Adventures novel Blood Heat (1993), Silurians of an alternate reality have conquered Earth after the Third Doctor was killed in their initial appearance, with the Seventh Doctor eventually forcing the humans and Silurians of this world into a truce. Contradicting the Warriors of the Deep novelisation, the novel The Scales of Injustice (1996) mentions that Icthar's shelter awoke forty years before the events of Doctor Who and the Silurians, and that the shelter is located on the other side of the world to the British Isles. In The Scales of Injustice, the power-hungry Silurian Auggi plans to eradicate humanity, beginning with an invasion fleet of Silurian hybrids on the Kent coast. UNIT successfully fights off this fleet. The Third Doctor also learns about the Silurians' battle cruisers and Myrka weapon in this book, both of which appear in Warriors of the Deep.

Silurians have also made many minor appearances in the Virgin New Adventures series of novels. By the 26th century, the time of human archaeologist Bernice Summerfield's, the term "Earth Reptile" has become popularly used to describe Silurians following their peaceful integration with human society, such as in the novel Eternity Weeps (1997). A Silurian short story, "Cold War", also features in the anthology Short Trips: Steel Skies (2003). Additionally, while not appearing in The Wheel of Ice (2012), they are mentioned; apparently, the Arkive attempted to lure them to Saturn, but they went into hibernation before this is possible. Madame Vastra also co-stars in the novella Devil in the Smoke (2012) and the novel Silhouette (2014).

Comics
The Silurians also make a number of appearance in comic books. Comic book story "Twilight of the Silurians" (1980) is set during the species' last days pre-hibernation, where Silurians observe captive "ape-men" in their zoological research station, millions of years ago. The comic book "City of Devils" (1983) features two Doctor Who companions, journalist Sarah Jane Smith and robot dog K-9 uncover a hidden city of Silurians (here, 'Eocenes') in an Egyptian archaeological dig, who seek peaceful coexistence with humans; this comic strip is based on the premise of the television spin-off special K9 and Company. In the story arc "Final Genesis" (1993), an alternate universe is depicted wherein Silurians made peace with humanity and the two races live in harmony; UNIT is renamed URIC, the 'United Races Intelligence Command'. In the Doctor Who Magazine comic strip cycle "The Cybermen" (1994–1996), the cyborg race of Cybermen discover Silurians and Sea Devils living on their own planet Mondas during an unspecified time in the past; in Doctor Who, Mondas is Earth's former "twin planet". The strip also portrays Golgoth, a primordial humanoid reptile god-figure, who resembles a Sea Devil and may have some link to the Silurians. Madame Vastra co-stars in the Doctor Who Magazine comic strip "The Crystal Throne" (2014).

Audio drama
Silurians also feature in the Big Finish Productions audio play Bloodtide (2001), in which the Sixth Doctor intervenes when Charles Darwin and the HMS Beagle expedition encounter a rogue Silurian group in the Galápagos Islands. The audio drama reveals that the leader of this group had been responsible for creating humanity's prehistoric ancestors via a forbidden breeding program, sabotaging the Silurian stasis chambers to escape punishment for his actions. In the audio drama The Poison Seas (2003), from the Bernice Summerfield series of adventures, Summerfield travels to the planet Chosan sometime in the future to assist a colony of Earth Reptiles (Sea Devils) under threat there. In UNIT: The Coup (2004), the Silurians attempt to finally make peace with the humans, though the general public believes it to be a stunt involving men in rubber suits. In UNIT: The Wasting (2005), Silurians aid UNIT in finding a cure for a deadly plague. In 2017, the Silurians appear in the Seventh Doctor audio The Silurian Candidate, where the Silurian Triad of 2088 attempt to infiltrate a crucial peace conference by brainwashing one of the participants so that he will kill himself and the other major leader in a manner that would trigger a nuclear war, but the Doctor is able to avert this plan, and instead proposes a new plan where the Silurian colonies will come out of suspended animation millennia in the future after Earth recovers from being ravaged by solar flares (as referenced in The Ark in Space), colonies gradually 'waking up' so that humanity and Silurians will essentially rebuild Earth without either side possessing numerical superiority.

Outside Doctor Who
Silurians also appear outside Doctor Who-related media. A cave drawing of a Silurian and a Sea Devil appear in a cave on Mars in Scarlet Traces: The Great Game written by Ian Edginton and drawn by Matt "D'Israeli" Booker. Silurians and Sea Devils are referenced in the second volume of Alan Moore's League of Extraordinary Gentlemen where they were connected to the creature from the Black Lagoon; League of Extraordinary Gentlemen is set in a fictional universe which reconciles the exploits of different fictional characters in one continuity.

A 2018 journal article published in the International Journal of Astrobiology, in which the authors discuss the hypothetical possibility of detecting evidence of ancient industrial civilizations in Earth's geologic record, makes reference to the "Silurian hypothesis" in its title.

 Summary of appearances 
This list does not include Madame Vastra who has her own list.

Doctor Who
 Doctor Who and the Silurians (1970)
 The Sea Devils (1972)
 Warriors of the Deep'' (1984)
 "The Hungry Earth" / "Cold Blood" (2010)
 "Legend of the Sea Devils" (2022)

Cameos
 "The Pandorica Opens" (2010)
 "A Good Man Goes to War" (2011)
 "The God Complex" (2011)
 "The Wedding of River Song" (2011)
 "Dinosaurs on a Spaceship" (2012)
 "Face the Raven" (2015)

Notes

References

Doctor Who races
Fictional reptilians
Television characters introduced in 1970
Fictional endangered and extinct species